Mantšonyane Airport  is an airport serving the town of Mantšonyane in Thaba-Tseka District, Lesotho.

The runway is on a low ridge in a dry oxbow off the Mantšonyane River. There is a hill at the north end of the runway, and higher terrain in all quadrants.

See also

Transport in Lesotho
List of airports in Lesotho

References

External links
 OpenStreetMap - Mantsonyane
 FallingRain - Mantsonyane Airport
 OurAirports - Mantsonyane

 Google Earth

Airports in Lesotho